The 1978 Florida A&M Rattlers football team represented Florida A&M University in the 1978 NCAA Division I-AA football season. The Rattlers had an overall record of 12–1 and were the Division I-AA national champions.

The Rattlers were led by fifth year head coach Rudy Hubbard; they played some home games at Bragg Memorial Stadium on their own campus, and other home games at the larger Doak Campbell Stadium on the campus of Florida State University. They finished their regular season with a 9–1 record, including a win over Bethune–Cookman in the Florida Classic rivalry game. The Rattlers then beat Grambling State in the Orange Blossom Classic to secure a spot in the I-AA playoffs. In the playoffs, the Rattlers won on the road against Jackson State, then beat UMass in the championship game, the Pioneer Bowl played in Wichita Falls, Texas.

In 1978, Florida A&M was a member of the Southern Intercollegiate Athletic Conference (SIAC), a Division II conference. The university had successfully petitioned the NCAA for Division I classification (Division I-AA in football), which took effect on September 1, 1978. The Rattlers captured the SIAC title in 1978, going undefeated in five conference games. This was the Rattlers' last season as a member of SIAC, as they would join the Mid-Eastern Athletic Conference (MEAC) the following year.

Statistical leaders for the season included Ike Williams (1274 yards rushing), Albert Chester (1088 yards passing), Chris Douglas (228 yards receiving), and Mike Solomon (12 touchdowns). A notable member of the team was placekicker Vince Coleman, who would go on to play 13 seasons in Major League Baseball, well known for his time with the St. Louis Cardinals.

Schedule

Roster

References

Further reading
 
 

Florida AandM
Florida A&M Rattlers football seasons
NCAA Division I Football Champions
Black college football national champions
Florida AandM Football